Brogliano is a town in the province of Vicenza, Veneto, Italy. It is southeast of SP246.

Twin towns
Brogliano is twinned with:

  Alella, Spain

Sources
(Google Maps)

References

Cities and towns in Veneto